Herpetogramma aeglealis, the serpentine webworm moth, is a species of moth of the family Crambidae. It was first described by Francis Walker in 1859 and is found in eastern North America.

The wingspan is 29–34 mm for males and 27–31 mm for females. Adults are sexually dimorphic. The hindwings of the males are dirty white with dark grey shading on the discal spot, wing veins, subterminal area and an irregular but contrasting postmedial line. Females have a golden hue. There are two forms, a darker and a typical form.

The larvae have been reared on a variety of herbaceous plants including ragwort, ferns, goldenrod, raspberry, pokeweed, wild ginger, and mayapple.

References

Moths described in 1859
Herpetogramma
Moths of North America